Sivell Lane (21 August 1881 – 10 February 1961) was an English cricketer.  Lane's batting and bowling styles are unknown. He was born in Ledbury, Hertfordshire.

Lane made his first-class debut for Gloucestershire against Surrey in the 1901 County Championship.  He made two further first-class appearances in that season, against Worcestershire and Lancashire.  In his three matches, he took 7 wickets at an average of 42.28, with best figures of 5/139.  These figures came on debut against Surrey.  With the bat, he scored just 16 runs at a batting average of 4.00, with a high score of 8.

He later moved to Canada, where he died at Toronto, Ontario on 10 February 1961.

References

External links
Sivell Lane at ESPNcricinfo
Sivell Lane at CricketArchive

1881 births
1961 deaths
People from Ledbury
Sportspeople from Herefordshire
English cricketers
Gloucestershire cricketers
British emigrants to Canada